Tom Noonan (born April 12, 1951) is an American actor, director, and screenwriter, best known for his roles as Francis Dolarhyde in Manhunter (1986), Frankenstein's Monster in The Monster Squad (1987), Cain in RoboCop 2 (1990), The Ripper in Last Action Hero (1993), Sammy Barnathan in Synecdoche, New York (2008), Reverend Nathaniel in Hell on Wheels (2011–2014), the Pallid Man in 12 Monkeys (2015–2018) and as the voice of everyone but the two main characters in Anomalisa (2015).

Noonan is also a writer and director of theatre and film. His debut feature film What Happened Was (1994) won the Dramatic Grand Jury Prize and Screenwriting Award at the Sundance Film Festival.

Early life
Noonan was born in Greenwich, Connecticut, the son of Rita (McGannon), a mathematics teacher, and John Noonan Sr., a jazz musician and doctor of dental surgery. He had an older brother, John Ford Noonan, a playwright, and two sisters, Barbara and Nancy. Noonan was a very talented basketball player, and said "playing basketball is how I learned to perform in a lot of ways. It’s how I got interested in performing... I never acted as a kid. I never did school plays. I never acted until I was 27...you learn a lot when you’re in front of people and you’ve got a crowd going and you’re doing something that you love to do. A lot of the skills that you would need for acting come through that... It’s like a life and death struggle in front of people that you hope to impress."

Career
Noonan started working in theatre (appearing in the original Off-Broadway production of Sam Shepard's play Buried Child), but in the 1980s he began working in film. His height was used for comic effect in "The Moving Finger," the series finale of the horror anthology Monsters (several episodes of which he also directed and wrote).

In 1986, Noonan played Francis Dolarhyde, a serial killer who kills entire families, in Michael Mann's Manhunter, the first movie to feature Hannibal Lecter. Another supporting role, and another collaboration with director Michael Mann was in 1995, as Kelso in Heat. He also played the Frankenstein monster in The Monster Squad. During the 1990s, he wrote various plays, including two that he made into movies, What Happened Was... (1994) and The Wife (1995). In the 2000s, Noonan appeared in various other movies, including a widely praised role as Sammy Barnathan in Synecdoche, New York, Charlie Kaufman's directorial debut.

Noonan has also made numerous appearances in television series, including The X-Files (in the much-praised 1996 episode "Paper Hearts" that was written specifically for him), Law & Order: Criminal Intent, Law & Order: Special Victims Unit, Tales from the Darkside and CSI: Crime Scene Investigation (in which he starred alongside William Petersen, who played his nemesis, Will Graham, in Manhunter), and Detective Victor Huntley in Damages. He recently appeared on Blacklist as The Stew Maker, Louie as a doctor who takes the young Louie through the crucifixion in graphic anatomical detail. He also portrayed the Reverend Nathaniel Cole in the AMC original series Hell on Wheels.

In 2015, Noonan voiced all of the supporting characters in Duke Johnson and Charlie Kaufman's stop-motion comedy-drama film Anomalisa, for which he won the San Diego Film Critics Society Award for Best Supporting Actor.

Filmography

Film

Television

References

External links
 
 
 GreenCine Daily Podcast with Tom Noonan for The House of the Devil

1951 births
20th-century American dramatists and playwrights
American male film actors
American male television actors
Living people
Male actors from Greenwich, Connecticut
Writers from Greenwich, Connecticut
American film directors
English-language film directors
Yale University alumni
Yale School of Drama alumni
20th-century American male actors
21st-century American male actors